The Reason may refer to:

The Reason (Hoobastank album)
 "The Reason" (Hoobastank song)
 "The Reason" (Celine Dion song)
 The Reason (Beanie Sigel album)
 The Reason (Diamond Rio album)
 The Reason (Lemar album)
 The Reason (band)
 "The Reason", a song by the Blizzards, from Domino Effect (album)
 "The Reason", a song by Lower Than Atlantis from Lower Than Atlantis (album)
 "The Reason", a song by Skrillex on Leaving (EP) (2013)

See also
Reason (disambiguation)